Panchito is a diminutive of the name Pancho, which in turn is a diminutive of the name Francisco. It may refer to:
Panchito Alba, stage name of Filipino actor Alfonso Tagle Sr.
Panchito Pistoles, Disney cartoon character
Francisco Velázquez, former Argentine roller hockey player
A Spanish profane term for a Mestizo or an indigenous Central or South American